Clear Skies is a machinima series created by Ian Chisholm, that is based on the fictional universe of the game Eve Online. The first film was released on May 29, 2008, followed by two sequels in 2009 and 2011.

Plot
The plot follows the crew of the Minmatar Tempest class battleship Clear Skies as they try to make a living in New Eden. The story begins with the ship's captain, John Rourke, negotiating the price of repairs for the ship at a space station, presumably following a pirate attack. The repairs leave them out of cash and looking for a new contract. Rourke finds a contract to transport Mr Smith—"an idiot in a shiny suit"—a short distance through the fringes of normally safe Empire space, with an unusually high payout. The crew grudgingly accepts the 'death trap' contract as the only applicable option in an unfruitful search.

Characters
 John Rourke voiced by Ian Chisholm
 Solomon Burke voiced by Richie Powles
 Charlie Fodder voiced by John Guthrie
 Tarquin Smith voiced by Dan Ellis
 Sascha Culhane voiced by Shazia Rochford
 Falcon Hausmann voiced by Ricky Grove
 Guy "Ghost" Stone voiced by Francis Capra

Production
The first two films were created using Editstudio 5, CoolEdit 96, FRAPs, the Source SDK and PaintShop Pro.
For the production of the third film Chisholm used Sony Vegas Pro 9, Adobe Aftereffects, Paintshop Pro, Adobe Photoshop, Cooledit 96, FRAPs, IPISoft Markerless Motion capture, Softimage XSI, CCP's in-house "Melissa engine", used for their game trailers, and the Source SDK.

In January 2020, Ian Chisholm stated Clear Skies 4 will be moving away from the Half Life Engine. He plans to use the 3D animation software iClone7 for production of the latest work in the series. According to this post, the script is complete after 9 months of work.

A few months later Chisholm posted a request for volunteers to work on the project. He estimates 2–3 years work will be required to complete the next movie.

Reception 
The reception to the films, while mostly confined to forums of Eve Online, has been overwhelmingly favourable.
Notably, CCP have featured Clear Skies on the player news page and on the ingame news section.

On the main distribution platform, EVE Files, Clear Skies has been downloaded via BitTorrent over 13000 times and Clear Skies 2 notes over 23000 torrent downloads.
Within the first 24 hours since release Clear Skies 3 was downloaded over 5000 times via BitTorrent.

Massively.com's James Egan calls Clear Skies a "machinima masterpiece".

In the year of the release, the first film won the Mackie Award in the category Best Long Format Film at the New York Machinima FilmFest 2008  and the Grand Prize Jury Award of the Machinima Expo.
Clear Skies 2 won the Jury Award of the Machinima Expo in 2009 and the public choice award at the Atopic Festival de films Machinima 2010.

Notes

External links
 at 

Machinima